Ruvin Peiris (born 22 September 2000) is a Sri Lankan cricketer. He made his Twenty20 debut on 4 March 2021, for Kurunegala Youth Cricket Club in the 2020–21 SLC Twenty20 Tournament.

References

External links
 

2000 births
Living people
Sri Lankan cricketers
Kurunegala Youth Cricket Club cricketers
Place of birth missing (living people)